The Poling System was a mathematical rating system used to rank college football teams. Its selections were published in the Football Review Supplement and several newspapers. The system was developed by Richard R. Poling, a native of Mansfield, Ohio who had played college football at Ohio Wesleyan University.

The Poling System is considered by the NCAA to have been a "major selector" of national championships for the years 1935–1984.

Champions
The Poling System named contemporary champions from 1935 to 1984 and retroactively named champions from 1924 to 1934.

References

College football championships
College football awards organizations